A War Diary is a 2001 Singaporean television series produced by Dream Forest Production. Set in the time of World War II, the series depicts the Battle of Singapore and life in Japanese-occupied Singapore from the point of view of an ethnic Chinese family. The dialogue, however, is primarily in English as the series was aired on the English-language television channel MediaCorp Channel 5. The series was nominated for four Asian Television Awards in 2002, including Best Drama Series.

Cast
 Tay Ping Hui as Lim Teck Meng
 Don Lim as Lim Teck Hock
 James Taenaka as Lieutenant Kinoshita Kenji
 Winston Chao as the resistance leader
 Tan Kheng Hua as Lim Swee Neo
 Fiona Xie as Rita Lim
 Carole Lin as Bee Lian
 Valentine Cawley as Stanley Warren
 Keagan Kang as Simon DeSouza 
 Tracy Tan as Susan
 Aaron Aziz
 Robin Leong
 Samuel He
 Lim Yu Beng
 Tony Quek
 Jomar Staverløkk

External links

A War Diary at MediaCorp.sg
Dream Forest Productions

2001 Singaporean television series debuts
Singaporean television series
2001 Singaporean television series endings
World War II television drama series
Channel 5 (Singapore) original programming